Mistea or Misthia, also known as Claudiocaesarea and Klaudiokaisareia, was a town of ancient Lycaonia, inhabited in Hellenistic, Roman, and Byzantine times. Misthia was the seat of an archbishop; no longer residential, it remains a titular see of the Roman Catholic Church.

Its site is located near Beyşehir, Asiatic Turkey.

References

Populated places in ancient Lycaonia
Former populated places in Turkey
Roman towns and cities in Turkey
Populated places of the Byzantine Empire
History of Konya Province